Michael Harris (born June 15, 1983) is an American professional basketball player who last played for the Magnolia Hotshots of the Philippine Basketball Association (PBA).

College career
Harris played college basketball for Rice University and finished his career as Rice's all-time leading scorer (2,014 points) and rebounder (1,111 boards).

Professional career
Harris played professionally for BC Kyiv of the Ukrainian Super League during the 2005–06 season. In the 2006–07 NBA preseason, Harris was signed by the Milwaukee Bucks, with whom he averaged 6.0 points per game and 2.4 rebounds per game in five preseason games before being cut from the team before the regular season started. Harris then spent the 2006–07 season with the Colorado 14ers of the NBA D-League. He averaged 11.8 points per game, 6.8 rebounds per game and 1.54 blocks per game in 48 games with the 14ers during the 2006–07 season.

Harris then signed a non-guaranteed deal with the Houston Rockets on July 13, 2008, and after averaging 5.0 points per game and 6.0 rebounds per game in Houston's first two preseason games, he was by waived the club before the season started on October 22.

In the 2007–08 season, Harris played for the Dongguan Leopards of the Chinese Basketball Association (CBA), averaging 28 minutes played per game, with 24.3 points per game and 11.6 rebounds per game in 25 games played. Following the end of the CBA season, Harris signed a 10-day NBA contract with the Houston Rockets on March 9, 2008, and after that he earned a contract from the club for the remainder of the season, with a team option for the next season. During the 2008–09 NBA preseason, Harris was released once again by the Rockets.

In the 2009–2010 season, Harris was signed by the Rio Grande Valley Vipers of the D-League. After averaging 25.3 points with the Vipers, he was signed by the Houston Rockets. On January 6, 2010, Harris was waived by Houston. Later that season, Harris briefly played for the Washington Wizards, before rejoining the Vipers. On March 24, 2010, he signed with the Houston Rockets for another stint. He was reassigned to the Vipers on April 13, 2010. Harris was also named the 09-10 NBA D-League MVP.

In the summer of 2012, Harris signed with the Minnesota Timberwolves. However, he was waived before the start of the 2012–13 season. Later that fall, he signed with the Jiangsu Dragons in China. At the end of the Chinese season, he joined the Leones de Ponce in Puerto Rico. During that season, Harris was chosen the Most Valuable Player of the league, averaging 20.4 ppg and 10.2 rpg.

On September 26, 2013, he signed with the Utah Jazz. On January 7, 2014, he was waived by the Jazz after 20 games, averaging 4.2 points per game. On January 22, 2014, he signed with the Zhejiang Golden Bulls in China for the rest of the 2013–14 CBA season. At the end of the Chinese season, he re-signed with the Leones de Ponce of Puerto Rico. Harris led the Leones de Ponce to the championship that season, and carried off the Finals MVP award.

In September 2014, he returned to China and signed with the Qingdao Eagles for the 2014–15 CBA season. On April 10, 2015, he re-signed with Leones de Ponce.

In October 2015, he signed with Sichuan Blue Whales for the 2015–16 CBA season. Harris helped lead Sichuan to their first-ever CBA title the following March, and re-signed with the Blue Whales for the 2016-17 CBA season, but missed much of the campaign with an injury.

Harris returned to Puerto Rico for another stint with the Leones de Ponce in the summer of 2017. He then signed with the Fujian Sturgeons in China for the 2017-18 CBA season.

NBA career statistics

Regular season 

|-
| align="left" | 
| align="left" | Houston
| 17 || 0 || 9.4 || .500 || .000 || .615 || 3.2 || .2 || .4 || .2 || 3.6
|-
| align="left" | 
| align="left" | Houston
| 8 || 0 || 10.3 || .370 || .000 || .556 || 2.5 || .4 || .5 || .1 || 3.1
|-
| align="left" | 
| align="left" | Washington
| 5 || 0 || 2.8 || .333 || .000 || 1.000 || .8 || .0 || .2 || .0 || .8
|-
| align="left" | 
| align="left" | Houston
| 4 || 0 || 4.0 || .500 || .000 || .500 || 1.3 || .3 || .0 || .3 || 2.0
|-
| align="left" | 
| align="left" | Utah
| 20 || 0 || 11.3 || .475 || .000 || .963 || 1.7 || .3 || .8 || .4 || 4.2
|-
| align="left" | Career
| align="left" | 
| 54 || 0 || 9.2 || .464 || .000 || .782 || 2.1 || .2 || .5 || .2 || 3.4

Playoffs 

|-
| align="left" | 2008
| align="left" | Houston
| 3 || 0 || 3.0 || .500 || .000 || .500 || .7 || .0 || .0 || .0 || 1.0
|-
| align="left" | Career
| align="left" | 
| 3 || 0 || 3.0 || .500 || .000 || .500 || .7 || .0 || .0 || .0 || 1.0

See also
 List of NCAA Division I men's basketball players with 2000 points and 1000 rebounds

Notes

External links

 Profile at Eurobasket.com

1983 births
Living people
21st-century African-American sportspeople
African-American basketball players
Al Riyadi Club Beirut basketball players
Alaska Aces (PBA) players
American expatriate basketball people in Bahrain
American expatriate basketball people in China
American expatriate basketball people in Lebanon
American expatriate basketball people in Kuwait
American expatriate basketball people in the Philippines
American expatriate basketball people in Qatar
American expatriate basketball people in South Korea
American expatriate basketball people in Ukraine
American men's basketball players
Atléticos de San Germán players
Basketball players from Texas
BC Kyiv players
Colorado 14ers players
Fujian Sturgeons players
Houston Rockets players
Jiangsu Dragons players
Leones de Ponce basketball players
Magnolia Hotshots players
People from Hillsboro, Texas
Philippine Basketball Association imports
Qingdao Eagles players
Rice Owls men's basketball players
Rio Grande Valley Vipers players
Shanghai Sharks players
Shenzhen Leopards players
Sichuan Blue Whales players
Small forwards
Undrafted National Basketball Association players
Utah Jazz players
Washington Wizards players
Zhejiang Golden Bulls players